(Helen) Hope Mirrlees (8 April 1887 – 1 August 1978) was a British poet, novelist, and translator. She is best known for the 1926 Lud-in-the-Mist, a fantasy novel and influential classic, and for Paris: A Poem (1920), an experimental poem published by Virginia and Leonard Woolf's Hogarth Press, which critic Julia Briggs deemed "modernism's lost masterpiece, a work of extraordinary energy and intensity, scope and ambition."

Biography
Born in Chislehurst, Kent, and raised in Scotland and South Africa, Mirrlees attended the Royal Academy of Dramatic Art before going up to Newnham College, Cambridge to study Greek. While at Cambridge, Mirrlees developed a close relationship with famous classicist Jane Ellen Harrison, Mirrlees' tutor and later her friend and collaborator.

Mirrlees and Harrison lived together from 1913 until the latter's death in 1928. Although they divided their time mainly between the United Kingdom and France, often returning to Paris to continue Harrison's medical treatments, their travels also took them to other European countries. Both of them studied Russian, Mirrlees earning a Diploma in Russian from the École des Langues Orientales of Paris, and went on to collaborate on translations from the Russian. Mirrlees and Harrison visited Spain in 1920, and there took Spanish lessons.

After Harrison's death, Mirrlees converted to Catholicism. In 1948, Mirrlees moved to South Africa and remained there until 1963, when the first volume of her "extravagant biography" of Sir Robert Bruce Cotton was published (the second volume is unpublished). Two volumes of poetry, Poems and Moods and Tensions, were also privately published.

Mirrlees was a friend of Virginia Woolf, who described her in a letter as "her own heroine – capricious, exacting, exquisite, very learned, and beautifully dressed." Her circle of celebrity friends also included T. S. Eliot; Gertrude Stein, who mentions Mirrlees in Everybody's Autobiography; Bertrand Russell; and Ottoline Morrell.

Mirrlees died in Thames Bank, Goring, England, in 1978, aged 91.

Writing

Mirrlees' 600-line modernist poem, Paris: A Poem, published in 1920 by Leonard and Virginia Woolf's Hogarth Press, is the subject of increasing attention by scholars of modernism, inspired by Julia Briggs's considerable study, and is considered by some to have had an influence on the work of her friend, T. S. Eliot, and on that of Virginia Woolf.

Mirrlees set her first novel, Madeleine: One of Love's Jansenists (1919), in and around the literary circles of the 17th Century Précieuses, and particularly those salons frequented by Mlle de Scudéry. Mirrlees later used medieval Spanish culture as part of the background of her second novel, The Counterplot (1924).

Lud-in-the-Mist was reprinted in 1970 in mass-market paperback format by Lin Carter, without the author's permission, for the Ballantine Adult Fantasy series, and then again by Del Rey in 1977. The "unauthorised" nature of the 1970 reprint is explained by the fact that, as Carter indicated in his introduction, he and the publishing company could not even ascertain whether the author was alive or dead, "since our efforts to trace this lady [Mirrlees] have so far been unsuccessful."

Since 2000, Mirrlees' work has undergone another resurgence in popularity, marked by new editions of her poetry, an entry in the Dictionary of National Biography and several scholarly essays by critic Julia Briggs, new introductions to Lud-in-the-Mist by writer Neil Gaiman and scholar Douglas A. Anderson, essays and a brief biography by writer Michael Swanwick, an artist-book facsimile reprint of Paris, a poem by printer and publisher Hurst Street Press, and translations of Lud-in-the-Mist into German and Spanish.

Joanna Russ wrote a short story, The Zanzibar Cat (1971), in homage to Hope Mirrlees and as a critique of Lud-in-the-Mist – and indeed the entire genre of fantasy, describing Fairyland "half in affectionate parody, but the other half very seriously indeed".

Hope-in-the-Mist, a book-length study of Mirrlees and her work by Michael Swanwick, was published by Temporary Culture in 2009.

The Collected Poems of Hope Mirrlees was published by Fyfield Books (Carcanet Press) in 2011 (edited by Sandeep Parmar). It includes previously unpublished poems, the full text of Paris, her later poems and prose essays from the 1920s. Sandeep Parmar is currently writing a biography of Mirrlees as well. She also features in the group biography Square Haunting by Francesca Wade (2020).

Bibliography

Fiction
Madeleine: One of Love's Jansenists, W. Collins Sons & Co. Ltd (1919)
The Counterplot, W. Collins Sons & Co. Ltd (1924)
Lud-in-the-Mist (1926)

Poetry
Paris: A Poem, Hogarth Press (1919)
Poems, Cape Town, Gothic (1963) 
Moods and Tensions: Poems (1976)
"Collected Poems of Hope Mirrlees" (2011), edited by Sandeep Parmar
Paris: A Poem, Hurst Street Press (2017)

Non-fiction
"Quelques aspects de l’art d'Alexis Mikhailovich Remizov", in Le Journal de Psychologie Normale et Pathologique, 15 January – 15 March (1926)
"Listening in to the Past", in The Nation & Athenaeum, 11 September (1926)
"The Religion of Women", in The Nation & Athenaeum, 28 May (1927)
"Gothic Dreams", in The Nation & Athenaeum, 3 March (1928)
"Bedside Books", in Life and Letters, December (1928)
A Fly in Amber: Being an Extravagant Biography of the Romantic Antiquary Sir Robert Bruce Cotton (1962)

Translations by Hope Mirrlees
The life of the Archpriest Avvakum by Himself (1924) with Jane Ellen Harrison
The Book of the Bear: Being Twenty-one Tales newly translated from the Russian  (1926) with Jane Harrison, the pictures by Ray Garnett

Translations
Le choc en retour (1929), translation by Simone Martin-Chauffier ("The Counterplot") 
Flucht ins Feenland (2003), transl. by Hannes Riffel ("Lud-in-the-Mist") 
Entrebrumas (2005) ("Lud-in-the-Mist")
 פריז - Paris: A Poem (2016) Hebrew transl. by Yehuda Vizan

References

The Oxford Dictionary of National Biography, entry by Julia Briggs
Holbrook Jackson, The Anatomy of Bibliomania, 2001
Annabel Robinson, The Life and Work of Jane Ellen Harrison, Oxford University Press, 2002

External links

 
 
 
 Hope Mirrlees papers, at the University of Maryland libraries
 Hope Mirrlees on the Web (hopemirrlees.com)
 Jane Harrison Gallery – contains a photo of Mirrlees with Jane Ellen Harrison
 The Lady Who Wrote Lud-in-the-Mist, by Michael Swanwick

1887 births
1978 deaths
English fantasy writers
British women novelists
British women poets
People from Chislehurst
20th-century British novelists
20th-century British women writers
British women short story writers
Women science fiction and fantasy writers
20th-century British poets
20th-century British short story writers